Bloomingdale is a borough in Passaic County, in the U.S. state of New Jersey. As of the 2020 United States census, the borough's population was 7,777, an increase of 121 (+1.6%) from the 2010 census count of 7,656, which in turn reflected an increase of 46 (+0.6%) from the 7,610 counted in the 2000 census.

History
Bloomingdale's Federal Hill was the site of the 1781 Pompton Mutiny, a winter revolt of Continental Army troops that was crushed by General Robert Howe on direct orders of General George Washington.

Growth in Bloomingdale was driven by the development in the late 1860s of a rubber mill and other factories in neighboring Butler. The New Jersey Midland Railroad, later known as the New York, Susquehanna and Western Railway, laid tracks adjacent to the settlement, with a Bloomingdale station located in what today is Riverdale. The northern section of Riverdale and most of Butler were known as East Bloomingdale and West Bloomingdale respectively during most of the 19th century. Despite crossing a county border, they also shared a school district and residents considered the whole area as "Bloomingdale" until about 1881 when a Post Office named Butler was designated. This began a period of rivalry which caused a schism between the residents of Butler and Bloomingdale resulting in separate schools, churches and even town bands.

Bloomingdale was incorporated as an independent borough on February 23, 1918, when Pompton Township was split up into three new municipalities along with Wanaque and Ringwood. Prior to that, the area was known as Bloomingdale throughout the 19th century and was initially a farming community starting about 1712 with the "Bloomingdale Forge" built shortly thereafter to take advantage of the iron in the hills. The business district along the Paterson-Hamburg Turnpike and the Pequannock River began about the middle of the 19th century.

Bloomingdale, like most municipalities in northeastern North Jersey, is a suburb of New York City. Some of the things that still link Bloomingdale to its past are its two churches (Methodist and Baptist), the Samuel R. Donald School (originally built in 1886) and the Bloomingdale Cornet Band continuously active since 1884.

DeLazier Field, used by the Triboro Little League, was the home field for the Minor League Baseball team known as the Bloomingdale Troopers of the North Atlantic League from 1946 to 1948.

The History of Bloomingdale can be found in three separate books published by the borough in 1958, 1968 and 1993. Additionally, more history can be found in microfilmed local newspapers located at the Butler Museum, the Morristown Library, the Paterson Library and the New Jersey State Archives.

Geography
According to the United States Census Bureau, the borough had a total area of 9.25 square miles (23.95 km2), including 8.80 square miles (22.79 km2) of land and 0.45 square miles (1.16 km2) of water (4.82%).

Lake communities in the borough include Glen Wild Lake, Lake Iosco, Kampfe Lake and Lower / Upper Morse Lake.

Unincorporated communities, localities and place names located partially or completely within the borough include Cold Spring Lake, Glenwild Lake, Iosco Lake, Lake Kampfe, Morse Lakes, Mothers Lake, Norvin Green State Forest, Pompton Junction, Star Lake and Twilliger Lake.

The borough borders Pompton Lakes, Ringwood, Wanaque and West Milford Township in Passaic County and both Butler and Riverdale in Morris County.

Demographics

2010 census

The Census Bureau's 2006–2010 American Community Survey showed that (in 2010 inflation-adjusted dollars) median household income was $79,044 (with a margin of error of +/− $15,773) and the median family income was $103,972 (+/− $5,906). Males had a median income of $56,974 (+/− $6,604) versus $47,204 (+/− $7,582) for females. The per capita income for the borough was $32,417 (+/− $3,746). About 3.3% of families and 5.7% of the population were below the poverty line, including 5.7% of those under age 18 and none of those age 65 or over.

Same-sex couples headed 23 households in 2010, up from the 14 counted in 2000.

2000 census
As of the 2000 United States census there were 7,610 people, 2,847 households, and 2,078 families residing in the borough. The population density was 864.7 people per square mile (333.9/km2). There were 2,940 housing units at an average density of 334.1 per square mile (129.0/km2). The racial makeup of the borough was 95.55% White, 0.42% African American, 0.12% Native American, 2.19% Asian, 0.67% from other races, and 1.05% from two or more races. Hispanic or Latino of any race were 4.36% of the population.

There were 2,847 households, out of which 31.8% had children under the age of 18 living with them, 60.9% were married couples living together, 8.7% had a female householder with no husband present, and 27.0% were non-families. 21.9% of all households were made up of individuals, and 6.2% had someone living alone who was 65 years of age or older. The average household size was 2.63 and the average family size was 3.09.

In the borough the population was spread out, with 22.3% under the age of 18, 6.4% from 18 to 24, 34.3% from 25 to 44, 25.2% from 45 to 64, and 11.9% who were 65 years of age or older. The median age was 38 years. For every 100 females, there were 97.8 males. For every 100 females age 18 and over, there were 94.9 males.

The median income for a household in the borough was $67,885, and the median income for a family was $75,433. Males had a median income of $46,351 versus $36,607 for females. The per capita income for the borough was $27,736. 3.4% of the population and 2.0% of families were below the poverty line. Out of the total people living in poverty, 3.8% are under the age of 18 and 3.5% are 65 or older.

Government

Local government
Bloomingdale is governed under the Borough form of New Jersey municipal government, which is used in 218 municipalities (of the 564) statewide, making it the most common form of government in New Jersey. The governing body is comprised of a Mayor and a Borough Council, with all positions elected at-large on a partisan basis as part of the November general election. A Mayor is elected directly by the voters to a four-year term of office. The Borough Council is comprised of six members elected to serve three-year terms on a staggered basis, with two seats coming up for election each year in a three-year cycle. The Borough form of government used by Bloomingdale is a "weak mayor / strong council" government in which council members act as the legislative body with the mayor presiding at meetings and voting only in the event of a tie. The mayor can veto ordinances subject to an override by a two-thirds majority vote of the council. The mayor makes committee and liaison assignments for council members, and most appointments are made by the mayor with the advice and consent of the council.

, the Mayor of the Borough of Bloomingdale is Democrat John D'Amato, whose term of office ends December 31, 2026. Members of the Bloomingdale Borough Council are Council President John Graziano (D, 2024), Dominic Catalano (D, 2025), Richard C. Dellaripa (D, 2025), Dawn R. Hudson (D, 2025), Evelyn M. Schubert (R, 2024) and Peyman "Ray" Yazdi (D, 2023).

Council President John D’Amato was selected to serve as acting mayor, filling the seat expiring in December 2023 that became vacant following the death of Jonathan Dunleavy in November 2020. In December 2021, after D'Amato was elected as mayor in the November 2021 general election, the Borough Council selected Dominic Catalano  from a list of three candidates nominated by the Democratic municipal committee to fill the seat expiring in December 2023 that had been held by John D'Amato until he stepped down from office after being certified as mayor; Catalano served on an interim basis until the November 2022 general election, when voters chose him to serve the balance of the term.

Federal, state, and county representation
Bloomingdale is located in the 5th Congressional District and is part of New Jersey's 39th state legislative district. 

Prior to the 2011 reapportionment following the 2010 Census, Bloomingdale had been in the 26th state legislative district.

 

Passaic County is governed by Board of County Commissioners, comprised of seven members who are elected at-large to staggered three-year terms office on a partisan basis, with two or three seats coming up for election each year as part of the November general election in a three-year cycle. At a reorganization meeting held in January, the board selects a Director and Deputy Director from among its members to serve for a one-year term. 
, Passaic County's Commissioners are 
Director Bruce James (D, Clifton, term as commissioner ends December 31, 2023; term as director ends 2022),
Deputy Director Cassandra "Sandi" Lazzara (D, Little Falls, term as commissioner ends 2024; term as deputy director ends 2022),
John W. Bartlett (D, Wayne, 2024),
Theodore O. "T.J." Best Jr. (D, Paterson, 2023),
Terry Duffy (D, West Milford, 2022),
Nicolino Gallo (R, Totowa, 2024) and 
Pasquale "Pat" Lepore (D, Woodland Park, 2022).
Constitutional officers, elected on a countywide basis are
County Clerk Danielle Ireland-Imhof (D, Hawthorne, 2023),
Sheriff Richard H. Berdnik (D, Clifton, 2022) and 
Surrogate Zoila S. Cassanova (D, Wayne, 2026).

Politics
As of March 2011, there were a total of 4,993 registered voters in Bloomingdale, of which 1,333 (26.7% vs. 31.0% countywide) were registered as Democrats, 1,154 (23.1% vs. 18.7%) were registered as Republicans and 2,505 (50.2% vs. 50.3%) were registered as Unaffiliated. There was one voter registered to another party. Among the borough's 2010 Census population, 65.2% (vs. 53.2% in Passaic County) were registered to vote, including 82.7% of those ages 18 and over (vs. 70.8% countywide).

In the 2012 presidential election, Republican Mitt Romney received 51.7% of the vote (1,849 cast), ahead of Democrat Barack Obama with 46.7% (1,670 votes), and other candidates with 1.6% (57 votes), among the 3,608 ballots cast by the borough's 5,215 registered voters (32 ballots were spoiled), for a turnout of 69.2%. In the 2008 presidential election, Republican John McCain received 2,077 votes (53.1% vs. 37.7% countywide), ahead of Democrat Barack Obama with 1,732 votes (44.3% vs. 58.8%) and other candidates with 50 votes (1.3% vs. 0.8%), among the 3,911 ballots cast by the borough's 5,159 registered voters, for a turnout of 75.8% (vs. 70.4% in Passaic County). In the 2004 presidential election, Republican George W. Bush received 2,078 votes (55.2% vs. 42.7% countywide), ahead of Democrat John Kerry with 1,603 votes (42.6% vs. 53.9%) and other candidates with 39 votes (1.0% vs. 0.7%), among the 3,767 ballots cast by the borough's 4,996 registered voters, for a turnout of 75.4% (vs. 69.3% in the whole county).

In the 2013 gubernatorial election, Republican Chris Christie received 68.6% of the vote (1,599 cast), ahead of Democrat Barbara Buono with 29.9% (697 votes), and other candidates with 1.5% (36 votes), among the 2,370 ballots cast by the borough's 5,219 registered voters (38 ballots were spoiled), for a turnout of 45.4%. In the 2009 gubernatorial election, Republican Chris Christie received 1,401 votes (54.3% vs. 43.2% countywide), ahead of Democrat Jon Corzine with 934 votes (36.2% vs. 50.8%), Independent Chris Daggett with 191 votes (7.4% vs. 3.8%) and other candidates with 30 votes (1.2% vs. 0.9%), among the 2,580 ballots cast by the borough's 4,932 registered voters, yielding a 52.3% turnout (vs. 42.7% in the county).

Education

The Bloomingdale School District serves public school students in pre-kindergarten through eighth grade. As of the 2019–20 school year, the district, comprised of three schools, had an enrollment of 564 students and 44.8 classroom teachers (on an FTE basis), for a student–teacher ratio of 12.6:1. Schools in the district (with 2019–20 enrollment data from the National Center for Education Statistics) are 
Martha B. Day Elementary School with 142 students in grades Pre-K–1, 
Samuel R. Donald Elementary School with 173 students in grades 2–4 and 
Walter T. Bergen Middle School with 241 students in grades 5–8.

For ninth through twelfth grades, high school-aged students from Bloomingdale in public school attend Butler High School in the adjacent community of Butler in Morris County, as part of a sending/receiving relationship with the Butler Public Schools. As of the 2019–20 school year, the high school had an enrollment of 471 students and 38.3 classroom teachers (on an FTE basis), for a student–teacher ratio of 12.3:1.

Transportation

Roads and highways

Interstate 287 is the most significant highway passing through Bloomingdale. However, there is no direct access to it within Bloomingdale, with the nearest interchanges being in adjacent towns. County Route 511 is the most significant road serving Bloomingdale directly.

Public transportation
Bloomingdale was served by the New York, Susquehanna and Western Railway commuter passenger service until 1966. NJ Transit provides bus transportation on the 194 route to the Port Authority Bus Terminal in Midtown Manhattan. In September 2012, as part of budget cuts, NJ Transit suspended service to Newark on the 75 line.

Notable people

People who were born in, residents of, or otherwise closely associated with Bloomingdale include:

 Michael DuHaime (born 1974), campaign manager of Rudolph Giuliani's campaign for the 2008 Republican presidential nomination
 Wendy Larry (born 1955), former head coach of the Old Dominion Monarchs women's basketball team
 Tim O'Connor (1927–2018), character actor known for his prolific work in television, including Peyton Place
 Scott A. Spellmon (born 1963), 55th Chief of Engineers of the United States Army and the commanding general of the U.S. Army Corps of Engineers

References

External links

 Bloomingdale official website

 
1918 establishments in New Jersey
Borough form of New Jersey government
Boroughs in Passaic County, New Jersey
Populated places established in 1918